This is a sortable list of Korean philosophers.

List
Three Kingdoms

Woncheuk  원측 圓測 (613–696) 
Wonhyo 원효  元曉 (617–686) see Essence-Function
Uisang 의상  義湘 (625–702)
Seol Chong 설총 薛聰 (650–730)

Goryeo

Joseon dynasty

Modern Korea

See also

 Korean philosophy

Korea
Philosophers